Algernon Chester-Master (27 September 1851 – 1 September 1897) was an English cricketer.

Chester-Master represented Gloucestershire in two first-class matches in 1870, against Surrey and the Marylebone Cricket Club.

Chester-Master died at Northampton, Northamptonshire on 1 September 1897.

Family
Chester-Master's son Edgar Chester-Master played first-class cricket for Gloucestershire and Minor Counties Cricket for Dorset.

References

External links
Algernon Chester-Master at Cricinfo
Algernon Chester-Master at CricketArchive

1851 births
1897 deaths
People from Almondsbury
English cricketers
Gloucestershire cricketers
Sportspeople from Gloucestershire